Parivakkam Subramaniam Veeraraghavan (born 24 December 1948) is a well known space scientist and rocket technologist of India. He has served as the Director of Vikram Sarabhai Space Centre (VSSC), Thiruvananthapuram, Kerala and as the Director of ISRO Inertial Systems Unit (IISU), Thiruvananthapuram. One of the most senior scientists at Indian Space Research Organization (ISRO), Veeraraghavan is known for his contributions to launch vehicle technology, especially in the areas of integration & checkout and Inertial Systems of ISROs launch vehicles. Presently, he is holding the honorary position of Prof. Vikram Sarabhai Distinguished Professor in VSSC, ISRO since January 2013.

Education and career
Veeraraghavan studied in Gopalapuram Boys High School, Chennai. After receiving his bachelor's degree in electrical engineering from College of Engineering, Guindy in 1969, he joined the Master's Programme at the Indian Institute of Technology, Madras and received his M.Tech. degree in Electrical and Electronics Instrumentation in 1971. He started his career in Vikram Sarabhai Space Centre, Indian Space Research Organisation in 1971. His first assignment was as Engineer-in-Charge of Checkout System development in the SLV-3 (Satellite Launch Vehicle) Project under the leadership of former ISRO scientist & former President of India, A. P. J. Abdul Kalam. He was responsible for the design and development of the Checkout system for the first SLV-3 Project. Shri Veeraraghavan has taken training in CNES, France, in Diamante Launching in 1971-72 and visited major space centres in Japan, U.S.A and France in 1984. At VSSC, he has been the Deputy Director, Mechanisms and Vehicle Integration and Testing (MVIT) and was responsible for integration, check-out and launch of ISRO Augmented Satellite Launch Vehicles (ASLV), Geosynchronous Satellite Launch Vehicles (GSLV), and Polar Satellite Launch Vehicles (PSLV).

In 2002, he took over as Director of ISRO Inertial Systems Unit (IISU) at Vattiyoorkavu, Thiruvananthapuram. At IISU he led the teams that developed sensor systems for launch vehicles and satellites. These inertial navigation systems guide the rockets in their trajectory, thus helping them to put the satellites in precise orbits. In 2009, Veeraraghavan took over as Director of VSSC from K. Radhakrishnan who has been appointed Chairman, Indian Space Research Organisation.

Positions held

Shri P. S. Veeraraghavan joined Indian Space Research Programme in 1971 in the erstwhile SLV-3 Project. He served in the following capacities prior to assuming charge as Director, Vikram Sarabhai Space Centre (VSSC), Thiruvananthapuram (Trivandrum), India:-

 Engineer-in-Charge, Checkout System Development, SLV-3 (1971–1982)
 Deputy Project Director, Electrical Integration and Checkout System (1982–1988)
 Head, Launch Vehicle Integration & Checkout Division, PSLV Project (1988–1993)
 Group Director, Launch Vehicle Integration & Checkout Group (1993–1999)
 Deputy Director, Mechanisms, Vehicle Integration & Testing Entity, VSSC (1999–2002)
 Director, ISRO Inertial Systems Unit, IISU, Thiruvananthapuram (2002–2009)
 Director, Vikram Sarabhai Space Centre (November 2009-December 2012)
 Prof. Vikram Sarabhai Distinguished Professor (January 2013 onwards)

Shri Veeraraghavan has made pioneering contributions to ISRO's Launch Vehicle Programmes. As Deputy Director of VSSC - Mechanisms and Vehicle Integration Testing (MVIT) he was responsible for Assembly, Integration and Checkout of ISRO's launch vehicles,  PSLV and GSLV till June, 2002.

In 2002, he took over as Director, ISRO Inertial Systems Unit (IISU), Vattiyoorkavu, Thiruvananthapuram.  At IISU, he was responsible for the development of Inertial System for both Launch Vehicle and Spacecraft. These inertial navigation systems guide the rockets through their trajectory to put the satellite in precise orbits.    The performance of these inertial navigation systems has been at par with those of other space fairing nations like Europe and the United States of America with excellent orbit injection accuracy.

The inertial navigation systems supplied by IISU for PSLV-C11 / Chandrayaan-1, India's first mission to the moon, have given very good orbital accuracy and contributed to precise orbital manoeuvres and very accurate lunar injection.  Under his able leadership, IISU has developed a number of advanced inertial sensors and systems and now achieved 100% self-reliance in the crucial technology of inertial sensors and systems.

In 2009, Dr S Ramakrishnan took over as Director, Vikram Sarabhai Space Centre - VSSC from Shri Veeraraghavan, who has been appointed as Chairman, Indian Space Research Organisation. Under his able leadership, VSSC made sparkling successes through 6 missions of PSLV namely PSLV C15/CARTOSAT 2B, PSLV C16/ RESOURCESAT, PSLV C17/GSAT12, PSLC18/MEGHAPROPIQUES, PSLV C19/RISAT1 and PSLV C21/SPOT6 and two missions of GSLV including the first test flight of indigenous Cryogenic stage. During his period, several major facilities of international class were established in VSSC like 1m Hypersonic Wind Tunnel, 6MW Plasma Wind Tunnel & Shock tunnel, 25Ton vibration shaker facility, 220Terra Flops super computing facility, etc. He also masterminded the development of various critical technologies and systems for the advanced missions of ISRO like Air Breathing Propulsion Project and Reusable Launch Vehicle Project.

Honors and awards

Shri PS Veeraraghavan is a recipient of prestigious VASVIK Award (Electronics) in 1997. He is also the recipient of the ASI Award of Astronautical Society of India. The 2002 ASI award was in recognition of his contribution to rocket and related technologies. He has also received ISRO's Performance Excellence Award for 2007 and the National Aeronautical Prize by Aeronautical Society of India for the year 2011.

Fellowships/memberships
Fellow, Aeronautical Society of India
Fellow, Indian National Academy of Engineering
Member, Astronautical Society of India
Member, Indian National Society for Aerospace & Related Mechanisms.

Publications
He has guided in publishing more than 1000 technical documents and around 100 technical papers for projects PSLV, GSLV, RSR, SRE, etc. and the various satellite projects of ISRO.

References

External links
ISRO Press Release
'Improve quality of engg education'

Tamil scientists
Indian Space Research Organisation people
IIT Madras alumni
Scientists from Thiruvananthapuram
Indian space scientists
Indian aerospace engineers
Living people
1948 births
20th-century Indian engineers
Engineers from Kerala